Executive Order 13766 is the second executive order signed by U.S. President Donald Trump. Signed on January 24, 2017, this order establishes a new system by which to fast-track the construction of infrastructure projects.

The executive order came as a precursor to an expected larger infrastructure spending proposal, which has been polled as one of Trump's most important campaign promises. The signing of this executive order came on the same day that Trump signed Presidential memoranda intended to permit the construction of the Keystone XL, the Dakota Access Pipeline, and stipulated that all new pipelines in the United States must be constructed using materials and equipment produced in the United States.

It was revoked by President Biden on January 20, 2021.

Provisions 

The executive order is broken down into four sections:

Executive agencies should expedite environmental reviews and approvals for all infrastructure projects. Projects such as electrical grid improvements and upgrades to ports, airports, pipelines, bridges, highways, and other projects that are deemed a "high priority to the nation" should be granted preference in this process.
Governors of States and executive agency heads may request that the Chairman of the White House Council on Environmental Quality (CEQ) approve infrastructure projects where a Federal review is needed. The Chairman shall provide a response within 30 days.
Executive agency heads shall provide written explanations to the Chairman of the CEQ explaining the causes for any delays in approval for project requests.
All actions taken as a result of this order must be consistent with existing law. The order shall not impair the abilities of any executive department or agency. The order shall not impact the functions of the Office of Management and Budget.

Impact 

In his speech to a joint session of Congress on February 28, 2017, Trump called for one trillion dollars of new infrastructure spending. This executive order is expected to streamline the construction of projects that come out of that spending package, should it pass the Congress.

See also
 List of executive actions by Donald Trump

References

External links

 Executive orders by Trump
 Office of the Press Secretary - Full Text of the Executive Order (as of January 24, 2017)
 Federal Register

2017 in American law
Executive orders of Donald Trump